The Beauty Queen of Jerusalem is an Israeli television series, based on the novel of the same name  by Sarit Yishai Levy. It aired beginning on June 7, 2021, on the Yes Drama channel. The first two episodes of the series have been available on Yes VOD since June 3, 2021. At an event held at East Tel Aviv in December 2021, Yes unveiled its new original productions for 2022. It officially announced that the series has been renewed for a second season, which will be screened toward the end of 2022.

The first half of Season 1 premiered on Netflix in the UK, France, the U.S., Argentina, Poland, Portugal, Spain and other areas of Europe on May 20, 2022  and the second half premiered in the same regions on July 29, 2022.  It closed the Israel Film Festival in Los Angeles in May 2022.
The series later became available on Netflix in Australia, Canada, The Netherlands, New Zealand and South Africa on February 9, 2023.

Filming of the series began in the summer of 2020 in various locations in the city of Safed, among them, at the Frenkel Frenel Museum and the Beit Castel Gallery.

Cast

Plot 
The series tells the story of the Armoza family, intertwined with the history of during Ottoman rule and then under the British Mandate on Israel. It also explores the family's fortunes during the subsequent periods of depression and war.

At the center of the series' plot, which takes place simultaneously on two timelines wherein present and past stories are presented alternately, are Gabriel Armoza (Michael Aloni), his wife Rosa (Hila Saada), and their three daughters: the eldest, Luna (Swell Ariel Or), who is her father's favorite; Rivka, and Rachel. The relationship between Gabriel and Luna contrasts with his lack of love for his wife Rosa. Her jealousy of Luna leads to difficult conflicts in the family.

Background and production 
After the novel sold more than 300,000 copies, Yes Drama bought the rights and adapted the novel The Beauty Queen of Jerusalem as a daily melodrama series. The creators are the screenwriters Shlomo Mashiach, Esther Namdar Tamam, and director Oded Davidoff, with Artza Production. Filming for the series began in the summer of 2020 in various locations in the city of Safed, including the Frenkel Frenel Museum and the Beit Castel gallery.

The daily TV series is based on the plot of the novel. The novel tells the story of the Armoza family of Jerusalem . They are a Ladino-Sephardic family that was cursed: The women who marry into the family are not loved by their husbands. The novel follows three generations of family from before the establishment of Israel until the 1970s.  

The theme song is written by Daniel Salomon.

External links

References 

Israeli drama television series
Judaeo-Spanish-language television shows